The Old Ryan Farm, also known as the Benjamin Temple House and the Temple–Ryan Farmhouse, is a historic house built  and located at 27 Federal City Road in the Ewingville section of Ewing Township in Mercer County, New Jersey, United States. It was added to the National Register of Historic Places on September 10, 1971, for its significance in agriculture and architecture. The house was moved from its original location on Pennington Road (New Jersey Route 31) in May 1973. The Benjamin Temple House is now operated as a historic house museum by the Ewing Township Historic Preservation Society.

History and description
The frame house was built  by local farmer Benjamin Temple. He was a brother-in-law of John Hart, a signer of the Declaration of Independence. The house was expanded  to two and one-half stories. The Temple family lived here until 1903, when Cornelia Temple died and the house was sold to Patrick Ryan. The Ryan family operated a dairy on the farm for fifty years.

See also
National Register of Historic Places listings in Mercer County, New Jersey
List of the oldest buildings in New Jersey
List of museums in New Jersey

References

External links

 

	
Ewing Township, New Jersey
National Register of Historic Places in Mercer County, New Jersey
Houses on the National Register of Historic Places in New Jersey
Houses in Mercer County, New Jersey
Farmhouses in the United States
Houses completed in 1750
1750 establishments in New Jersey
New Jersey Register of Historic Places